Guy Edward Thwaites  (born 19 January 1971) is a British professor of infectious diseases at the University of Oxford, and director of the Oxford University Clinical Research Unit (OUCRU) in Ho Chi Minh City in Vietnam. His focus is on severe bacterial infections, including meningitis and Staphylococcus aureus bloodstream infection, and tuberculosis. He is a former first-class cricketer.

Early life and education
Guy Thwaites was born in Brighton in January 1971, to cricketer and physician Ian Thwaites. He was educated at Eastbourne College, before going up to Girton College, Cambridge. There he completed his pre-clinical years before doing a year in art history. While studying at Cambridge, Thwaites played first-class cricket for Cambridge University Cricket Club in 1991 and 1992, making four appearances. He scored 68 runs in his four first-class matches at an average of 11.33, with a highest score of 32. Subsequently, he gained admission to study medicine at the United Medical and Dental Schools of Guy's and St Thomas' Hospitals, from where he graduated.

While a student, with a friend doing a history PhD, he came across the story of sudor anglicus, the mysterious English sweating sickness of the 15th and 16th centuries. In 1998, five years after the hantavirus outbreak in the US made headlines, and then working at St Thomas' Hospital, he co-authored a paper hypothesising that the mysterious medieval illness was very similar to that in the US and could have been hantavirus pulmonary syndrome. After discovering the grave of Henry Brandon, who he believed had been affected by the illness, he did not propose plans to exhume the body for DNA analysis.

Career
Thwaites trained in infectious diseases and microbiology at Brighton University, the Oxford University Clinical Research Unit (OUCRU) in Ho Chi Minh City in Vietnam, and the Hospital for Tropical Diseases, London. In Vietnam he was a Wellcome Trust Clinician Scientist Fellow and mentored by Nicholas White and Jeremy Farrar. After more than four years there he returned to London, and two years later joined the MRC Centre for Molecular Bacteriology and Infection at Imperial College, where he worked on the bacteria Staphylococcus aureus. He was appointed consultant at  Guy's and St Thomas' in 2011.

Thwaites was later appointed professor of infectious diseases at the University of Oxford, and focuses on severe bacterial infections, including meningitis and Staphylococcus aureus bloodstream infection, and tuberculosis. In 2013 he returned to Vietnam as director of the OUCRU, replacing Farrar. In January 2021 in response to the COVID-19 pandemic he said "vaccination is the only long term strategy".

Honours
In 2018 he was elected a Fellow of the Academy of Medical Sciences in the UK. He holds honorary professorship at the MRC Clinical Trial Units at University College London. In 2021 he was appointed a Member of the Order of the British Empire (MBE) for services to public health.

Selected publications

References

External links

Thwaites in Google Scholar

1971 births
Living people
People from Brighton
People educated at Eastbourne College
Alumni of Girton College, Cambridge
English cricketers
Cambridge University cricketers
English microbiologists
Academics of the University of Oxford
Vaccination advocates
Members of the Order of the British Empire
Fellows of the Academy of Medical Sciences (United Kingdom)